Totem – Episodio uno is the first EP of the Totem saga by the Italian rapper En?gma released on October 16, 2020, followed by the second part Totem – Episodio due.

Description 
This EP contains 5 tracks, among which "Bomaye", a single from the album and released on September 26 of the same year. The concept of the album is to create a storytelling that hooks from track to track.

Track listing

References 

EPs by Italian artists
2020 EPs
Alternative hip hop EPs